Two ships of the Royal Navy have been named HMS Wrenn.

 , a 12-gun ship, captured in 1653 and sold on 29 September 1657.
 , a 10-gun pink, 103 tons, launched on 21 March 1694 and captured by the French Navy off Rye on 28 March 1697.

See also

References
 

Royal Navy ship names